Tenille Swartz, (born 13 May 1987 in Parys) is a professional squash player who represented South Africa. She reached a career-high world ranking of World No. 28 in April 2008.

See also
Official Women's Squash World Ranking
WISPA Awards

References

External links 

1987 births
Living people
People from Parys
South African female squash players
Competitors at the 2005 World Games